Gurdon School District is a school district in Clark County, Arkansas, serving Gurdon. It operates three schools: Gurdon Primary School, Cabe Middle School, and Gurdon High School.

The district serves Gurdon, Okolona, and Whelen Springs.

The Okolona School District was dissolved on July 1, 1987; portions of the district were absorbed by the Gurdon School District.

References

Further reading
  (Download) - Map of the Okolona district and predecessor districts

External links
 
 

School districts in Arkansas
Education in Clark County, Arkansas